Vision1 Racing (UCI Code: VOR) was a professional British cycling team based in Belgium. It was provisionally ranked 11th for the 2009 season, meaning it was invited to all World Cup races.

Major wins
2009
Stage 2 & 3b Emakumeen Euskal Bira, Nicole Cooke
Overall Giro del Trentino Alto Adige - Südtirol, Nicole Cooke
Stage 2, Nicole Cooke
Redmond, Cyclo-cross, Helen Wyman
Saint-Quentin, Cyclo-cross, Christel Ferrier-Bruneau
Döhlau, Cyclo-cross, Helen Wyman
Faè, Cyclo-cross, Helen Wyman
Wetzikon, Cyclo-cross, Helen Wyman

National champions
 British National Cyclo-cross Championship, Helen Wyman
 France National Road Race Championship, Christel Ferrier-Bruneau
 British National Road Race Championships, Nicole Cooke

Team roster
2009

Ages as of 1 January 2009.

External links
Official  website

UCI Women's Teams
Cycling teams based in the United Kingdom
Cycling teams established in 2008
Defunct cycling teams based in the United Kingdom